Paraclemensia is a genus of moths of the family Incurvariidae.

Species
Paraclemensia acerifoliella (Fitch, 1854)
Paraclemensia caerulea (Issiki, 1957)
Paraclemensia cyanea Nielsen, 1982
Paraclemensia cyanella (Zeller, 1850)
Paraclemensia incerta (Christoph, 1882)
Paraclemensia monospina Nielsen, 1982
Paraclemensia oligospina Nielsen, 1982
Paraclemensia viridis Nielsen, 1982

References
Paraclemensia at funet

Incurvariidae
Adeloidea genera